Established in 1946, Gansu Agricultural University (GAU) is a non-profit public higher education institution in the small city of Lanzhou (250,000-499,999 inhabitants), Gansu. Officially accredited/recognized by the Department of Education, Gansu Province, GAU is a large (15,000-19,999 students) coeducational institution. Gansu Agricultural University (GAU) offers courses and programs leading to officially recognized higher education degrees such as bachelor's degrees, master's degrees, doctorate degrees in several areas of study.

It is one of the universities on the first list of China's Excellent Agricultural and Forestal Personnel Training Project. This 70-year-old institution has a selective admission policy based on entrance examinations. GAU provides academic and non-academic facilities and services to students including a library, sport facilities and/or activities, as well as administrative services.

History
August 1945: College of National North-Western Agricultural established by Ministry of Education.

1950: Its name changed to North-Western Veterinary College.

1958: It moved to Huang Yang town from Lanzhou and combined with the College of Gansu Agricultural. Later it changed the name to Gansu Agricultural University.

1981: Its campus moved back to Lanzhou city.

Academic programs and departments
SThere are 15 departments in Lanzhou campus, which including 53 Bachelor programs, eight Master programs, and seven doctorate programs.

Additionally, practaculture science, animal science, and veterinarian have been prized as the National Key Academic Programs.

References

External links
 University website

 
Universities and colleges in Gansu
Education in Lanzhou